Deuterocopus famulus is a moth of the family Pterophoridae. It is found on the Moluccas.

References

Moths described in 1908
Deuterocopinae